The Washington Huskies softball team represents the University of Washington in NCAA Division I college softball competition. A member of the Pac-12 Conference, they play their home games on-campus at Husky Softball Stadium in Seattle, Washington. Through 2020, the Huskies have made 14 appearances at the Women's College World Series and won the national title in 2009.

History

Beginnings 
The program's first season was in 1993, and head coach Teresa Wilson quickly built the team into a national powerhouse, qualifying for the NCAA tournament in their second season, and guiding it to the Women's College World Series six times, including the title games in 1996 and 1999. The team finished no worse than fifth in the nation from 1996 to 2000 and Wilson compiled a record of 532–198–1. However, Wilson's tenure was cut short in late 2003, when the coach was implicated in a scandal involving dispensing drugs among her players. She became the second high-profile coach Washington fired that year following Huskies football coach Rick Neuheisel's dismissal in an NCAA wagering scandal.

After Wilson's dismissal, Scott Centala and Steve Dailey split the head coaching role for one season in 2004.

The Heather Tarr Era begins 
After the 2004 season ended, interim Athletic Director Dick Thompson named UW alum Heather Tarr as Washington's new head coach. Tarr led the Huskies to back-to-back super regionals in her first two seasons, before making her first Women's College World Series as a coach in 2007, led by sophomore sensation Danielle Lawrie in the pitcher's circle.

The Huskies would get multiple doses of bad luck immediately after, though. Lawrie was named to Canadian National team for the 2008 Summer Olympics in Beijing, meaning she'd have to miss the 2008 season to prepare. Right before the season started, Ashley Charters and Lauren Greer, two of UW's seniors, suffered season-ending injuries. Without three of their best players, the Huskies went 30-25-1 and made the NCAA Tournament, but failed to make it past their regional for the first time since 2002.

The 2009 Championship run 
In 2009, though, Lawrie, Charters, and Greer were all back, and Washington opened the year 18–0. The Huskies end the regular season ranked No. 3 in the country, a finish that normally would guarantee them home field advantage through the WCWS. But since Husky Softball Stadium did not have permanent lights, it was ineligible to host NCAA postseason games, and the Huskies were sent to Amherst, Massachusetts for the regional.

The Huskies breezed through their first game and ground out a win in their first matchup against UMass, but a loss to the Minutewomen on Sunday set up a decisive final game. Lawrie faced off against UMass ace Brandice Balschmiter. The two dueled for 15 innings, before the Huskies finally broke through with five runs in the top of the 15th to win 6-1 and send them to the super regionals, where they'd face Georgia Tech in Atlanta.

Washington made quick work of the Yellow Jackets, beating them 7–1 in the first game and 7–0 in the second to punch their ticket to Oklahoma City.

At the WCWS, UW advanced to the semifinals through the winners bracket with wins over Georgia and Arizona State. After losing their first semifinal game to the Bulldogs, the Huskies won the decisive second game to move on to their first championship series since 1999.

Washington blew Florida out in Game 1 of the series, 8–0, before grinding out a 3–2 win the next night to give the Huskies their first National Title. This marked the 22nd time in 28 seasons of World Series play in which the Pac-12 had won.

Since the Championship 
Led by Lawrie in her final season, UW spent the entirety of the 2010 season ranked No. 1, finishing the regular season with a record of 45–6, but lost its first two games to be the first team knocked out of the WCWS.

Washington didn't return to OKC until 2013, when the Huskies made the semifinals.

UW missed the WCWS for three straight seasons for the first time in program history from 2014 to 2016, though the Huskies did make the Super Regionals twice in that span.

Led by sophomore ace Taran Alvelo, the Huskies began their rise back to the highest levels of national prominence in 2017. After beating both No. 2 Auburn and No. 1 Oklahoma in their opening weekend, the Huskies spent much of the season in the top-10, with hopes of securing a top-eight seed, which would guarantee them home-field advantage throughout the tournament, and went into its final regular season series against Utah squarely at No. 8. After taking the first two games of the series, Washington fell behind 12–1, but then scored four runs in the top of the fifth to avoid the mercy rule before tying the game at 12–12 in the top of seventh to force extra innings and completing the 12-run comeback with a run in the top of the eighth to win. Washington earned the No. 7 seed in the tournament, breezed through its Regional, and won its Super Regional (a rematch against Utah) at home to punch its ticket to the WCWS. There, Alvelo led the way to low-scoring upsets of No. 3 Oregon and No. 9 UCLA, but a pair of losses to No. 1 Oklahoma ended the Huskies' season in the semifinals.

In 2018, Washington opened up the season with a perfect 28-0 nonconference record, led by the pitching combination of Alvelo and freshman Gabbie Plain. The Huskies spent much of the season ranked No. 1 in the country, but back-to-back series sweeps at the hands of No. 3 UCLA and No. 2 Oregon disrupted their momentum with one weekend left in the regular season. UW bounced back with a sweep of Oregon State and earned the No. 5 seed in the tournament, where it swept through its regular and super regional. Plain started the Huskies' first game in OKC, with Alvelo coming in for the save in a 2–0 win over No. 4 Oklahoma. Tarr repeated the strategy in Washington's next game against Oregon, with Plain going the first six innings and Alvelo slamming the door in the seventh in a 6–2 win over No. 1 Oregon. Come the semifinal, though, Tarr gave the ball to Alvelo to start, and the junior struck out six in a complete-game shutout to send UW to the championship series with a 3–0 win.  There, Washington was set up to face No. 6 Florida State. In Game 1 of the series, Plain and FSU's Meghan King traded shutout innings before the Seminoles finally got on the board with a solo home run in the sixth inning to win 1–0. In Game 2, UW jumped out early 3–0, but Florida State came back with eight unanswered runs to win the game and clinch the championship.

UW notched its third straight 50-win season in 2019, bouncing back from a sweep at the hands of No. 1 UCLA and National Player of the Year Rachel Garcia by winning 23 of its final 24 games to earn the No. 3 seed in the tournament, where it won five straight games to advance to the WCWS. The Huskies lost their opening matchup to Arizona in extra innings, before winning a pair of loser-out games against Minnesota and Oklahoma State to advance to the semifinals, where they would have to beat UCLA twice. Plain and Alvelo both dueled with Garcia for nine shutout innings, with Plain throwing six shutout innings before giving the ball to Alvelo for the next three. Plain reentered the game in the bottom of the 10th inning and allowed a walk-off, three-run home run to Garcia to end the Huskies' season with a 3–0 loss.

Washington opened up the 2020 season with a 23-2 nonconference record, but the remainder of its season was canceled the week that Pac-12 play was supposed to begin due to the COVID-19 pandemic.

Year-by-year results 
Italics denotes conference championship

Bold denotes national championship

*The 2020 season was canceled after 25 games due to the COVID-19 pandemic.

Notable players

National awards
USA Softball Collegiate Player of the Year
Danielle Lawrie (2009, 2010)

Conference awards
Pac-12 Player of the Year
Kristen Rivera (2004, 2005)
Baylee Klingler (2022)

Pac-12 Pitcher of the Year
Jennifer Spediacci (2000)
Danielle Lawrie (2009, 2010)
Gabbie Plain (2021)

Pac-12 Freshman of the Year
Jenny Topping (2000)
Tia Bollinger (2001)
Taran Alvelo (2016)

Pac-12 Defensive Player of the Year
Jennifer Salling (2011)
Sis Bates (2018, 2019, 2021)

Pac-12 Coach of the Year
Teresa Wilson (1996, 2000)
Heather Tarr (2010)

Retired numbers
The program has retired one jersey number.

Program records 
Source

Career records

Field
During their inaugural season of 1993, the Huskies' home field was across Lake Washington in Bellevue, at Hidden Valley Park.

The Huskies opened the $2.2 million Husky Softball Stadium  in 1994, adjacent to Husky Stadium. East of the football stadium's north grandstand, it shares the view of Mount Rainier to the southeast. The seating capacity is 1,000 in the main grandstand, with up to an additional 500 in bleacher seating. During the 2010 season, standing-room only tickets were sold before games, behind the main sections and along the walkways to the outfield general admission seating. The venue added lights in 2010 to be eligible to host NCAA tournament games (regionals and super regionals). Beginning in 2017, UW began allowing fans onto the bleachers behind the end zone at Husky Stadium, overlooking the right-field line for postseason games.

On March 14, 2019, UW Athletics announced plans to build a "Softball Performance Facility" near Husky Softball Stadium which will contain batting cages and other training facilities. The original plan was to build it into the side of Husky Stadium, but since has been revised to have the facility be next to Nordstrom Tennis Center.

See also
List of NCAA Division I softball programs

References

External links
 
 GoHuskies.com